Adobe Audition is a digital audio workstation developed by Adobe Inc. featuring both a multitrack, non-destructive mix/edit environment and a destructive-approach waveform editing view.

Origins
Syntrillium Software was founded in the early 1990s by Robert Ellison and David Johnston, both former Microsoft employees. Originally developed by Syntrillium as Cool Edit, the program was distributed as crippleware for Windows computers. The full version was useful and flexible, particularly for its time. Syntrillium later released Cool Edit Pro, which added the capability to work with multiple tracks as well as other features. Audio processing, however, was done in a destructive manner (at the time, most computers were not powerful enough in terms of processor performance and memory capacity to perform non-destructive operations in real-time). Cool Edit Pro v2 added support for real-time non-destructive processing, and v2.1 added support for surround sound mixing and unlimited simultaneous tracks (up to the limit imposed by the computer hardware). Cool Edit also included plugins such as noise reduction and FFT equalization.

Ever since the earliest versions, Cool Edit 2000 and Cool Edit Pro supported a large range of import/export codecs for various audio file formats. When MP3 became popular, Cool Edit licensed and integrated the original Fraunhofer MP3 encoder. The software had an SDK and supported codec plugins (FLT filters), and a wide range of import/export format plugins were written by the developer community to open and save in a number of audio compression formats. The popular audio formats and containers supported by Cool Edit with built-in codecs or plugins were Fraunhofer MP3, LAME MP3, Dolby AC3, DTS, ACM Waveform, PCM waveform, AIFF, AU, CDA, MPEG-1 Audio, MPEG-2 Audio, AAC, HE-AAC, Ogg Vorbis, FLAC, True Audio, WavPack, QuickTime MOV and MP4 (import only), ADPCM, RealMedia, WMA Standard, WMA Professional, WMA Lossless and WMA Multichannel.

Adobe purchased Cool Edit Pro from Syntrillium Software in May 2003 for $16.5 million, as well as a large loop library called "Loopology". Adobe then renamed Cool Edit Pro to "Adobe Audition".

Version

Version 1
Adobe Audition was released on August 18, 2003. It had bug fixes but no new features and was essentially a more polished Cool Edit Pro 2.1 under a different name. Adobe then released Audition v1.5 in May 2004; major improvements over v1 included pitch correction, frequency space editing, a CD project view, basic video editing and integration with Adobe Premiere, as well as several other enhancements.

Version 2
Adobe Audition 2 was released on January 17, 2006. With this release, Audition (which the music recording industry had once seen as a value-oriented home studio application, although it has long been used for editing by radio stations) entered the professional digital audio workstation market. The current version included two sections. Multitrack View supported up to 128 digital audio mono or stereo tracks at up to 32-bit resolution. In the track controls section one could select the input and output for each track (the program supported multiple multi-channel sound cards), select "record", "solo", and "mute", and access the effects rack. New features included Audio Stream Input/Output (ASIO) support, VST (Virtual Studio Technology) support, new mastering tools (many provided by iZotope), and a redesigned UI. Adobe also included Audition 2.0 as part of its Adobe Production Studio bundle.

Version 3
Adobe Audition 3 was released on November 8, 2007. New features included VSTi (virtual instrument) support, enhanced spectral editing, a redesigned multi-track interface, new effects, and a collection of royalty-free loops.

CS2 activation servers' shutdown: Adobe Audition 3, with some other CS2 products, was released with an official serial number, due to the technical glitch in Adobe's CS2 activation servers (see Creative Suite 1 & 2).

Version 4 (CS5.5)
Audition 4, also known as Audition CS5.5, was released on April 11, 2011, as part of Adobe Creative Suite. Audition 4 was shipped as part of the Adobe Creative Suite 5.5 Master Collection and Adobe Creative Suite 5.5 Production Premium, replacing the discontinued Adobe Soundbooth. Audition 4 was also made available as a standalone product. Enhanced integration with Adobe Premiere Pro allowed editing of multitrack Premiere projects, and users of third-party software were served by the introduction of OMF- and XML-based import-export functions. Other new features included improved 5.1 multichannel support, new effects (DeHummer, DeEsser, Speech Volume Leveler, and Surround Reverb), a history panel, faster and fully supported real-time FFT analysis, and a new audio engine (more reliable and faster) for non-ASIO devices.

According to Adobe, Audition CS5.5 was rewritten from the ground up to take advantage of parallel/batch processing for performance and make it a platform-agnostic product. Audition CS5.5 now works on Windows and Mac platforms. Over 15 years of C++ code was analyzed, and many features of the previous Audition 3 were ported or enhanced. Notable features that were present in Audition 3, but removed for CS5.5, include VSTi support and MIDI sequencing. Unlike all the previous versions, this is the first release to be available as a Mac version as well as a Windows version. Many other features from previous Windows versions of Adobe Audition, such as FLT filters, DirectX effects, clip grouping, many effects (Dynamic EQ, Stereo Expander, Echo Chamber, Convolution, Scientific filters, etc.) were removed  as the product was rewritten to have identical cross-platform features for Windows and macOS. Some of the features were later restored in Audition CS6 but the wide range of audio codec compression/decoding filters for import/export of various audio file formats were discontinued.

Version 5 (CS6)
Adobe showed a sneak preview of Audition CS6 in March 2012 highlighting clip grouping and automatic speech alignment (which had its technology previewed in September 2011).
Audition CS6 was released on April 23, 2012, as part of both Creative Suite 6 Master Collection and Creative Suite 6 Production Premium. It included faster and more precise editing, real-time clip stretching, automatic speech alignment, EUCON and Mackie control surface support, parameter automation, more powerful pitch correction, HD video playback, new effects, and more features.

Version 6 (CC)
Adobe Audition 6, also more commonly known as Audition CC, was released on June 17, 2013. It is the first in the Audition line to be part of the Adobe Creative Cloud. Also, Audition CC is now the first 64-bit application in the Audition line. This can provide faster processing time when compared to Audition CS6. New features include sound remover, preview editor, and pitch bender.

Version 7 (CC 2014)
Adobe Audition 7 was released in June 2014 with the name Adobe Audition CC 2014.  New with this release came support for Dolby Digital and Dolby Digital Plus formats, custom channel labels, a new UI skin, High DPI support, enhanced clip and track colors and navigation, minimize tracks, tools for splitting all clips at the playhead, and more.

Version 8 (CC 2015)
Adobe Audition 8 was released in June 2015 with the name Adobe Audition CC 2015.  This release offered Dynamic Link video streaming which enabled Audition to display a Premiere Pro project sequence as a video stream at full resolution and frame rate and with all effects, without needing to render to disk.  Other features included support for displaying that video content on an external display, scheduled recording, customization of level meter crossover values, automatic session backup, automatic storage of assets alongside session files, import/export of markers, options to relink media, and the addition of Brazilian Portuguese language support.  The 8.1 update in the fall of 2015 first unveiled Remix which could analyze a music track and recompose it to a different duration, tools for generating speech based on the OS text-to-speech voice libraries, new options for ITU-based loudness conformation, and the ability to expand and create custom functionality and integration with the Adobe Content Extensibility Platform (CEP) panel support.  This update also removed "Upload to Soundcloud" support as the API had been abandoned by SoundCloud and was no longer functional.

Version 9 (CC 2015.2)
Adobe Audition 9 was released in June 2016 with the name Adobe Audition CC 2015.2.  Of most importance with this release was the new Essential Sound panel, which offered novice audio editors a highly organized and focused set of tools for mixing audio and would soon be introduced to Premiere Pro allowing non-destructive and lossless transfer of mixing efforts between the two applications.  This release also supported exporting directly to Adobe Media Encoder, supporting all available video and audio formats and presets.

Version 10 (CC 2017)
Adobe Audition 10 was released in November 2016 with the name Adobe Audition CC 2017.  A new, flat UI skin and the introduction of the Audition Learn panel, with interactive tutorials, spearheaded this release.  This also marked the introduction of the Essential Sound panel and the sharing of all real-time Audition audio effects with Premiere Pro.  The 10.1 update in Spring, 2017, offered deep channel separation and manipulation features when working with multichannel audio recordings in Multitrack view, significant improvements to interchange with Premiere Pro sharing all effects and automation non-destructively when transferring a sequence to Audition for mixing, and added spectrum meters to many audio effects.  This update also offered the visual keyboard shortcut editor common across other Adobe applications and offered native support for the Presonus Faderport control surface and mixer.

Version 11 (CC 2018)
Adobe Audition 11 was released on October 18, 2017, with the name Adobe Audition CC.  (The year moniker was dropped from all Creative Cloud applications.)  With this release, users were able to easily duck the volume of music behind dialogue and other content types with the new Auto-Ducking feature available in the Essential Sound panel.  Multitrack clips were enhanced with fixed z-order, new fade features such as symmetrical fade in/out and fixed duration/curve adjustments.  Performance of mixdowns and bounces improved up to 400%.  Smart monitoring provides intelligent source monitoring when recording punch-ins and ADR.  Video timecode overlay can display source or session timecode without burn-in, a new Dynamics effect with auto-gate, limiting, and expansion simplifies compression for many users, and support for any control surfaces and mixers which use Mackie HUI protocol for communication rounds out the release.  Dolby Digital support was removed from this release, though import continues to be supported through the most recent operating systems.

Version 12 (CC 2019)
Adobe Audition 12 was released on October 17, 2018, with the main new features being DeNoise and DeReverb effects. Other new features include: Multitrack Clip improvements, Mulitrack UI improvements, Zoom to time, Add or delete empty tracks, Playback and recording improvements. Third-party effect migration.

Version 12.1 (April 3, 2019)
Punch and roll recording: This record mode allows you to record audio using the punch and roll technique with pre-roll, visual countdown, and Punch Again functionality. If you made a mistake while recording audio, this feature allows you to correct mistakes and continue recording without interruption.

Zoom to selected clip: Quickly zoom to the time range of one or more selected clips using the Zoom menu command. In the Multitrack Editor, choose Zoom > Zoom To Selected Clips.

Auto-ducking ambience sound: You can now auto duck ambience sound for a more seamless editing experience. While working on a project, automatically generate a volume envelope to duck ambience sound behind dialogue, sound effects, or any other audio clip using the Ducking parameter in the Essential Sound panel.

Nudge clip up and down: You can now nudge a clip up and down using keyboard shortcuts. Freely move selected clips without taking your hands away from the keyboard.

Version 12.1.1 (June, 2019)
Audition provides stability and performance improvements.

Version 12.1.2 (July, 2019)
Audition provides stability and performance improvements.

Version 12.1.3 (August, 2019)
Audition provides stability and performance improvements.

Version 12.1.3 (September, 2019)
Audition provides stability and performance improvements.

Version 13 (2020)
Adobe Audition 13 released with improved effects support, route multichannel effects channels with full control and overlapped clips support.

Version 13.0.6 (May 2020)
Default audio device switching: Select System Default when selecting audio input and output devices to use the device that is currently in use by the operating system.

Export video clip range: While editing, audio and video clip's range are often different. If the range does not match, black video frames will be appended while the audio is still playing. You can now set the export range to video clip while exporting using AME.

Version 13.0.8 (July 20200)
Provides stability and performance improvements along with bug fixes.

Link Media: This feature allows you to relink files and associated session clips using the Files Panel without having to search for your offline clips in the Editor View. All clips which reference the media of the file will be relinked to the new media. When opening Sessions with offline media, offline files will be created to offer relink functionality for the corresponding Session Clips. With this update of Adobe Audition, you can relink offline media by selecting the offline item in the Files Panel in order to select new media and relink all associated clips of the Session Or from the Opening Files dialog when media is missing.

The context menu entry, Link All Media Clip has been replaced with the Relink Media context menu in the Files Panel.

Default audio device switching for macOS: Select System Default when selecting audio input and output devices in Audition to use the device that is currently in use by the operating system. The device will automatically switch when new devices are plugged in or connected. This feature is also available in Adobe Premiere Pro, Adobe After Effects, Adobe Character Animator, AME and Premiere Rush on macOS.

Version 13.0.9 (August 2020)
Provides stability and performance improvements along with bug fixes.

Version 13.0.11 (October 2020)
Following drawing issues with macOS 11 are fixed:
Peak files might have inaccuracies in the multitrack.
When spectral view is moved there might be redrawing issues.
Waveform drawing might be incorrect if there's a selection and the user switch out and then back into Audition.
There might be issues with artifacts on waveform when making selections.

Version 13.0.12 (November 2020)
Provides stability and performance improvements along with bug fixes.

Following drawing issues are fixed:

Clip fade envelopes might fail to draw when manipulated if multiple clips are selected vertically and horizontally.
If a clip is relinked to a clip of a different channelization and merged in Multitrack, it might crash upon playing.

Version 13.0.13 (January 2021)
Provides stability and performance improvements along with bug fixes.

Following drawing issues are fixed:

Audition may crash while scrubbing in the Waveform Editor when it gains or loses focus, if the audio device's sample rate is not a multiple of the file's sample rate.
Merge Selected Markers during Waveform Editor recording stops recording and deletes all audio between markers.
Moving marker in Waveform Editor with EUCON enabled might lead to the application to crash.
Audition crashes on quit when saving unsaved documents and copying the media to the session folder.
Crash when exporting mixdown to Premiere Pro without selecting file's channel format (MAC-only).
There might be errors in duration of compound audio/video file.
MP3 files may be exported with different sample rate than selected.
Fade is still displayed but no longer sounds after ripple delete removes a fade.
Fade out doesn’t hold its position relative to the end of a clip on ripple delete.

Version 14 (February 2021)
Following drawing issues are fixed:

Multitrack mixdown does not remember the MP3 bit rate setting last used.
When exporting a session with copies of associated files, files might export with default format.
Keyframe at clip edge disappears at certain clip lengths / zoom levels.
Symmetrical fades on MT clips always forces Cosine Fade on the mirrored fade.
Rescanning VST/VST3/AU effects after initial scan can fail.

Version 14.0 (March 2021)
Insert mode in Waveform Editor: The new Insert mode in the Waveform editor enables you to insert audio at playhead position without overwriting.

Keyframe dragging: Keyframe dragging is now limited until the clip edge and cannot be dragged beyond clip boundaries.

Equitable language: To better reflect core Adobe values of diversity and inclusion, we have replaced non-inclusive language and reference imagery in Premiere Pro, After Effects and Audition.

Version 14.1 (April 2021)
Fixed issues:

Spectral Frequency Display does not show correct data while recording in Waveform Editor.
Clicking Repair on one click in the DeClicker removes all of the other clicks from the Repair list if one channel is disabled in the Waveform Editor
DeClicker doesn't repair the "click(s)" in any of the channels if one channel is disabled.
Audition could crash when canceling "Adaptive multichannel tracks have been converted to multiple mono tracks" warning dialog when opening a .prproj in Audition.
HUD did not work after recording a clip to a selection in the Waveform Editor.
Effect presets in Chorus/Flanger, DeEsser, and Vocal Enhancer cannot be selected after importing older version prefs in AU 14.0.

Version 14.2 (May 2021)
Audition on Apple M1: Audition now runs natively on Apple M1 systems providing improved performance for recording and mixing high-quality audio content.

Strip Silence: Use new Strip Silence to automatically identify and remove silent or inactive regions in recorded clips, without losing synchronization in multitrack audio.

New Loudness Meter: The new Loudness Meter provides industry standard ITU-based loudness monitoring for broadcast, podcast, and streaming media content.

Versoin 14.4 (June 2021)
Fixed issues:

Incorrect sample rate was displayed in the audio hardware preference for MME (Windows) if system default input and output are used and the input and output sample rates differ.
If file is cut into two or more clips, Strip Silence doesn't analyze, strip, or split beyond the first clip.
Audition could crash while opening video file when both Preview Editor and Spectral Pitch are open.
Audition could crash when making a selection in the Waveform editor when Preview Editor and Spectral Frequency are open.
Loudness Radar is listed as a track and clip effect in Mac ARM native Audition.
CD burning library could not be loaded on Windows machines.

Version 22 (October 2021)
Unified version numbers: With this major release, all the Adobe video and audio applications will align on version number 22.0, making it easier to ensure compatibility across the applications.

Fixed issues in Adobe Audition: This release provides stability and performance improvements along with bug fixes.

Fixed issues in Adobe Audition version 22.0: Incorrect 3rd party effects list is automatically imported on application upgrade on mac ARM. Curves change shape symmetrically when Right clicking on the fade handle and selecting Crossfade.

Version 22.2
Fixed issues:

Punch and Roll recording in Audition's waveform editor was introducing an unexpected amount of pre-roll audio signal.
Clip Panning envelope would not render on mixdown or bounce if only a few channels of the source file are used.
Audio latency could be higher than expected when routing tracks to sub-mixes.
Latency compensation is off when sending to busses Pre-Fader causing an echo.

Version 22.3
Relinking a clip can select the wrong channels from the source file and change the channelization of the clip.

Version 22.4 (May 2022)
Provides general bug fixes.

Version 22.5
Fixed issues:

Using Ctrl+Tab to switch between open files does not work on Windows.
OneDrive not visible in Media Browser.

Version 22.6
Fixed issues:

Audition crashing when pulling out headphones during playback in ASIO mode.
Control moves to the Delete button in the Favourites menu after clicking on Play.

Version 23 (October 2022)
Fixed issues:

An Error Message Workspaces Manager not initialized appears when setting the Workspaces to Reset to Saved Layout.
The Reset Layout button overlaps the Request Layout button when we create a multitrack session by selecting Mono in Mix.

See also

Comparison of multitrack recording software

References

External links

2003 software
Audition
Audition
Digital audio workstation software